KSML (1260 MHz) is a terrestrial American radio station, paired with an FM relay translator, broadcasting an urban contemporary gospel format. Licensed to Diboll, Texas, United States, the station serves the Lufkin-Nacogdoches area. The station is currently owned by Kasa Family Limited Partnership.

Translator

History
The station was assigned the call letters KAFX on 1986-03-03.  on 1988-12-14, the station changed its call sign to KAFX, on 1989-01-01 to KDFX, on 1996-02-09 to the current KSML,

References

External links
NBC Sports 1260 Facebook

SML
Radio stations established in 1986
1986 establishments in Texas